Polynoncus gordoni is a species of hide beetle in the subfamily Omorginae found in Peru.

References

gordoni
Beetles described in 1981